Bến Thành Market is located in the center of Hồ Chí Minh City, Vietnam in District 1. The market is one of the earliest surviving structures in Saigon and an important symbol of the city. Ben Thanh Market is a famous destination for many local and foreign tourists from all around the world. The market operates all year round and opens at around 6am every day until the official closing time at 6pm. After 6pm, the day market transitions into a night market which runs until 10pm.

Today, Ben Thanh Market welcomes more than 10,000 visitors per day to shop and visit. The market has nearly 1,500 booths with more than 6,000 small businesses selling wholesale and retail items from consumables to luxury goods. Currency exchanges are not required by some vendors but most prefer Vietnam's currency, Vietnamese dong.

Location 

Ben Thanh Market is situated in the center of Ho Chi Minh in Ben Thanh Ward, District 1. The market is located on an intersection of four busy streets. The main entrance or Southside is on Le Loi street/Quach Thi Trang roundabout, the Northside on Le Thanh Ton, the Eastside on Phan Boi Chau and the Westside on Phan Chau Trinh.

The market was originally structured to be near the Saigon River. As a former wet market, the surrounding canals offered the convenience for boats to pick up and drop off items for trade. After being relocated in 1912 near the My Tho railway station (currently the Saigon bus station, the market possesses one of the most optimal locations in District 1.

About the Market

Day Market 

Four main market gateways also serve as a directory for its customers. Each gate has a designated area to sell specialty items. For example, the southern gate is divided among garments, textiles, and clothing along with shoes, jewelry, and cosmetic products. The Northern gate is where people can find a variety of fresh fruits, fish and poultry. This is also where the food vendors are set up to sell common Vietnamese dishes like pho, broken rice, bun bo hue, bun thit nuong, banh beo, grilled seafood and desserts. The Eastside also offers edible goods that are packaged such as dried seafood and poultry, roasted peanuts, candied fruit, coffee beans, tea, fish sauce, herbs, and spices. On the opposite side, the Western gate offers predominantly arts and ceramics.

Night Market 

Ben Thanh Market is also very lively at night. At 6 pm UTC+07.00, vendors set up brightly lit stalls on two sides of the big streets Phan Boi Chau and Phan Chu Trinh. The stalls offer similar items to the day market but with a greater emphasis on food. Some street stalls expand into sit down restaurants offering tables and seats. Many locals gather to the area after work and it's also suitable for tourist as they offer western-style menus in English.

History 

The market developed from informal markets created by early 17th-century street vendors gathering together near the Saigon River. The market was formally established by the French colonial powers after taking over the Gia Định citadel in 1859 (see Citadel of Saigon). This market was destroyed by fire in 1870 and rebuilt to become Saigon's largest market. In 1912 the market was moved to a new building and called the New Bến Thành Market to distinguish over its predecessor. The building was renovated in 1985.

The original market started out in the early 17th century as an informal wet market founded by local street vendors. When the neighboring Gia Dinh citadel was overthrown by French imperialists in 1859, the market was properly constructed and declared a formal establishment along French Colonial lines. The original structure included a wooden thatched roof which would later be destroyed by fire in 1870 was rebuilt to become called "Les Halles Centrales".

In 1912, the market was moved into the building people are familiar with today, using fireproof metal structure to become the largest and most central of the markets in the city. When all the vendors moved into the new market building the old building was not demolished but instead transitioned to a wholesale market known as the Old Market or Chợ Cu. As for the new market, the name changed to Ben Thanh Market to be distinguished from its predecessor. The name Ben Thanh derives from the words "harbor" (Ben) and "citadel" (Thanh).

In 1985 the new market went under major renovations to keep up with the city's progress of a modern blend. Despite many restorations over time, the market remains one of the earliest and most iconic surviving structures of Saigon.

Architecture 

Ben Thanh market has a total area of 13,056 m². The 100-year-old building has a unique Indochina design that stands out among the modern and contemporary buildings around Saigon center. Throughout the years, the market underwent major renovations to both the exterior and interior but the overall architecture remained with its iconic clock tower in the foreground.

Since the building was constructed around the time of the French Colonial Era, the building holds strong French influence. Khuong Van Muoi, President of the city Architects’ Association, said the build adopted some of its unique features from French architects. He mentions the orientation of the building and banners along the roof that extends over the market to provide shade. These designs were integrated specifically for natural air-conditioning.

Transportation 

The Tan Son Nhat International Airport is located within the city limits and only 7 kilometers from the market. From Tan Son Nhat International Airport, the market can be easily accessed by taxis (Vinasun/Mai Linh), Grab, motorbike, bike, or bus. Directly across from Ben Thanh Market is the Saigon bus station.

Apart from being a major hub for the network of city buses serving Hồ Chí Minh City, Ben Thanh Station will be a hub for several lines of the planned Hồ Chí Minh City Metro; Line 1, under construction, will connect the market with Suối Tiên Park and Long Binh in District 9. Other lines will connect Bến Thành with Tham Luong in District 12, and with Cholon and Binh Tan District.

References

External links
 Ben Thanh Market on google maps

Retail markets in Ho Chi Minh City
Clock towers in Vietnam
Buildings and structures completed in 1912
1912 establishments in Vietnam